The Monroe Sports were a minor league baseball team based in Monroe, Louisiana. The Sports played as members of the Class C level Cotton States League from 1950 to 1955, winning the 1955 league championship. The Sports became a New York Yankees affiliate in 1955 and continued the affiliation in 1956, when the team joined the Class C level Evangeline League after the Cotton States League folded. The Sports hosted home minor league games at Casino Park.

History

Cotton States League 1950 to 1955
The Sports were immediately preceded by the Monroe White Sox, who played their final season in the Cotton States league in 1941. The White Sox also played home games at Casino Park.

Monroe, Louisiana next hosted minor league baseball in 1950, when the Monroe Sports franchise resumed play as members of the eight–team Class C level Cotton States League. The Helena Seaporters franchise relocated to Monroe following the 1949 season. The Clarksdale Planters, El Dorado Oilers, Greenville Bucks, Greenwood Dodgers, Hot Springs Bathers, Natchez Indians and Pine Bluff Judges joined Monroe in beginning league play on April 15, 1950.

In their first season of play, the Monroe Sports finished 2nd in the Cotton States League standings. The Sports ended the 1950 season with a record of 81–56, finishing 2.5 games behind the 1st place Pine Bluff Judges, as Al Mazur served as manager. In the 1st round of the playoffs, the Hot Springs Bathers defeated Monroe Sports 4 games to 2. Cliff Coggin of Monroe led the league with 21 wins and teammate Ronald Lurk had a 1.55 ERA, best in the league.

Monroe won the 1951 Cotton States League pennant. The Sports ended the 1951 season with a record of 89–51, placing 1st and finishing 6.0 games ahead of the 2nd place Greenwood Dodgers, as Al Mazur returned as manager. In the playoffs, the Natchez Indians defeated Monroe 4 games to 3. Monroe pitcher Billy Muffett led the Cotton States League with 22 wins and a 2.25 ERA.

The 1952 Monroe Sports qualified for the Cotton States League Playoffs. Monroe ended the 1952 regular season in 4th place with a record of 66–60.
Fred Harrington served as manager, as the Sports ended the season 12.0 games behind the 1st place Meridian Millers, who then defeated Monroe 4 games to 2 in their 1st round playoff series. Monroe player John Jones led the league with both 91 RBI and 102 total hits.

The Monroe Sports finished last in the 1953 Cotton States League standings. The Sports ended the 1953 season with a record of 50–76, placing 8th under returning manager Fred Harrington. Monroe finished 29.5 games behind the 1st place Meridian Millers. Through 1953, the Cotton States League and its member teams were not integrated, as written in the league by-laws. In 1953, the Cotton States League attempted to evict the Hot Springs Bathers for attempting to add two former Negro leagues players, Jim Tugerson and his brother Leander Tugerson to their roster. The league owners voted, 6-0, with Pine Bluff abstaining, to expel the Bathers. On April 15, 1953, the National Association of Professional Baseball Leagues, ruled against the Cotton States League action and reinstated the Bathers franchise. By choice Jim and Leander Tugerson instead played for the Knoxville Smokies of the Mountain States League to begin the season. The Cotton States League became integrated in 1954, when Uvoyd Reynolds played for Hot Springs.

In 1954, the Monroe Sports ended the Cotton States League regular season in 4th place and qualified for the playoffs. With a record of 53–67, the Sports finished 4th as the league reduced to six teams. Ed Head served as manager, as Monroe finished 27.5 games behind the 1st place Greenville Tigers. In the playoffs, Greenville defeated the Monroe Sports4 games to 1. Monroe pitcher William Halley led the league with 176 strikeouts.

The 1955 season was the final year of the Cotton States League and the Monroe Sports won both the league pennant and league championship, as the team became a minor league affiliate of the New York Yankees.The Monroe Sports ended Cotton States League regular season with a record of 76–41, finishing 1st in the standings. Playing under returning manager Ed Hear, the Sports finished 7.5 games ahead of the 2nd place El Dorado Oilers in the six–team league. In the 1st round playoffs, Monroe swept the Hot Springs Bathers in 4 games. In the Cotton States League Finals Monroe won the championship by defeating the  El Dorado Oilers 4 games to 3. Marshall Gilbert of Monroe led the league with 19 home runs and 101 RBI.

1956 Evangeline League
In 1956, after the folding of the Cotton States league, the Monroe Sports played their final season, with the team becoming members of the eight–team, Class C level Evangeline League and remaining as a New York Yankees affiliate. The Sports joined the Alexandria Aces, Baton Rouge Rebels, Crowley Millers, Lafayette Oilers, Lake Charles Giants, New Iberia Cardinals and Thibodaux Senators in beginning league play on April 19, 1956.

The Monroe Sports ended the 1956 Evangeline League season with a record of 54–68, placing 7th and did not qualify for the playoffs. With Ed Head returning as manager, the Sports finished last after New Iberia folded on May 19, 1956. The Sports finished 27.5 games behind the 1st place Lafayette Oilers in the regular season standings. The Sports had home total attendance of 25,000 after drawing 57,000 the season before.

The Evangeline League resisted becoming an integrated league. In 1956, the Chicago Cubs assigned two black players, to their affiliate, the Lafayette Oilers, but the team refused to accept them to their roster. Boycotts ensued throughout the league and subsequently, Lafayette Parrish, home of the Baton Rouge Rebels, passed legislation making it illegal for black players to play in its ballparks. The Evangeline League itself also officially banned non–white players from appearing on the rosters of any league teams. These blocks forced the major league teams to reassign the players to other leagues. Due to boycotts, the 1956 playoff finals, featuring Lafayette were cancelled as a result.

In 1957, the Monroe franchise did not return to the Evangeline League, which reduced to six teams and permanently folded following the season. Monroe, Louisiana has not hosted another minor league team.

The ballparks
The Monroe Sports hosted minor league home games at Casino Park. The ballpark was opened in 1931 and had field dimensions of (left–center–right) 360–450–330 in 1950. Casino Park was located at De Siard Street & South 29th Street, at the Missouri Pacific RR tracks. The ballpark also hosted the Negro leagues Monroe Monarchs, of the 1931 Texas–Louisiana Negro League and 1932 Negro Southern League. Today, there is a marker for the Monroe Monarchs near the former ballpark site. The Sports were also noted to have some played home games at the renamed American Legion Memorial Stadium, which was constructed in 1950.

Timeline

Year–by–year records

Notable alumni

Jim Bronstad (1955)
Rod Kanehl (1955–1956)
Billy Muffett (1950–1951)
Bill Short (1956)
Bill Tremel (1950)
Jim Willis (1950)

See also
Monroe Sports players

References

External links
 Monroe - Baseball Reference
Ballpark photos

Defunct minor league baseball teams
Defunct baseball teams in Louisiana
Baseball teams established in 1950
Baseball teams disestablished in 1956
Cotton States League teams
Evangeline Baseball League teams
New York Yankees minor league affiliates
Sports teams in Monroe, Louisiana